Robin Michele Mathy (born July 21, 1957) is an author, activist, and editor. She has published four books and more than 50 peer-reviewed articles or book chapters.

Her first book, Male Homosexuality in Four Societies:  Brazil, Guatemala, the Philippines, and the United States, coauthored with Frederick L. Whitam, has been in print since 1986 and was selected by the New York Times Review of Books as one of the Best Books in Print in Anthropology.  Her work has been cited over 1200 times in scientific, peer-reviewed journals.

She has graduate degrees in Sociology from Indiana University-Bloomington, Social Work from University of Minnesota-Twin Cities, International Relations from the University of Cambridge, and Evidence-Based Health Care from the University of Oxford.

Selected publications 

 Male Homosexuality in Four Societies: Brazil, Guatemala, the Philippines, and the United States, Praeger Publishers, 1985. Author. .
 Childhood Gender Nonconformity and the Development of Adult Homosexuality, CRC Press, 2007. Editor. . 
 Lesbian And Bisexual Women's Mental Health, Routledge, 2004. Editor. .
 Preventive Health Measures for Lesbian and Bisexual Women, CRC Press, 2007. Editor. .

References

1957 births
Living people
University of Minnesota College of Education and Human Development alumni
American anthropology writers
Transgender writers
20th-century American women writers
20th-century American non-fiction writers
American women non-fiction writers